The Bolivia men's national volleyball team represents Bolivia in international volleyball competitions and friendly matches.

Results

Bolivarian Games
 2005 — 3rd place

Squads
Squad at the 2005 Bolivarian Games.
Head Coach: Raúl David García

References
CSV

Volleyball
National men's volleyball teams
Men's sport in Bolivia
Volleyball in Bolivia